The 2012 Pirelli World Challenge season was the 23rd running of the Sports Car Club of America's World Challenge series. All races were televised by NBC Sports Network. All telecasts were tape-delayed, with all races being streamed live.

Format change

The series began using a four class format. A new "touring car B-spec" class was introduced, similar to the SCCA's amateur divisions, using vehicles such as the Fiat 500, Chevrolet Sonic, Ford Fiesta, Honda Fit, Kia Rio, Mazda 2, and Nissan Versa. The new class debuted at the event at Miller.

Schedule
Four rounds were announced November 11, 2011, with an additional three rounds announced November 18, and the round at St. Petersburg announced January 4.  A second Touring Car race was later added to the Mid-Ohio round.  The GT and GTS classes had 12 races, Touring Car had 14, and Touring Car B-Spec had 9.

Race results

Championships

Drivers' Championships
Championship points are awarded to drivers based on qualifying and finishing positions.  In addition, 5 bonus points are awarded to a driver leading a lap during a race, and 5 bonus points are awarded to the driver leading the most laps.

GT

GTS

TC

TCB

Manufacturer championships
Manufacturer points are awarded according to the highest-finishing car from that manufacturer.  Only manufacturers that are SCCA Pro Racing corporate members receive points.  Points are awarded on the following basis:

In addition, one bonus point is awarded to the pole-winning manufacturer.  In the table below, the manufacturer's top finishing position is shown, with pole winner in bold.

GT

GTS

TC

TCB

References

Pirelli World Challenge
GT World Challenge America